Colepaugh is a surname. Notable people with the surname include: 

Chris Colepaugh, Canadian blues-rock musician 
William Colepaugh (1918–2005), American spy and defector to Nazi Germany